Shea-Oak Log is a settlement in South Australia adjacent to the Sturt Highway. At the 2011 census, Shea-Oak Log had a population of 175. Major industries in the area are manufacturing/engineering, grain and pig farming.

References

Towns in South Australia